Serena-Maneesh (previously spelled Serena Maneesh, sometimes shortened to S-M) is a Norwegian alternative rock band from Oslo.

Biography
The team of musicians who each contribute to the band's sound is organized around songwriter Emil Nikolaisen.

Important sources of musical inspiration have been The Velvet Underground, The Stooges, AC/DC, Amon Düül, Gainsbourg/ Vannier, many greats of bossanova and anything beyond.
In late 2005, the band toured Europe in support of The Dandy Warhols. In early 2006, Serena-Maneesh landed the opening gig for British band Oasis during its UK tour. They supported Nine Inch Nails on the Australia/Japan leg of their 2007 world tour.

The highly acclaimed self-titled debut album was released on the Norwegian record-label HoneyMilk in the autumn of 2005. In December of the same year, the Norwegian vinyl label Hype City released an LP print featuring two exclusive tracks, and the Spanish indie distributor Touchme Records published the CD. In March 2006, the band announced its transfer to the Playlouder-branch of the Beggars Group established in Europe (UK, Germany and Italy), North America (United States and Canada) and Oceania (Australia). In June 2006, the band released an international edition of its self-titled album (both CD and LP) through the international label Playlouder.

The second album Serena Maneesh 2: Abyss in B Minor was released in March 2010, on the British independent label 4AD.

Band members
Current members
Emil Nikolaisen – vocals, guitar
Ådne Meisfjord – electronics

Former or associated members
Hilma Nikolaisen – bass
Øystein Sandsdalen – guitar
Tommy "Manboy" Akerholdt – drums
Lina (Holmstroem) Wallinder – vocals, percussion, organ
Sondre Tristan Midttun – guitar
Håvard Krogedal – organ, cello
Eivind Schou – viola
Anders Møller – percussion
Einar Lukerstuen – drums
Ann Sung-An Lee – vocals, percussion, organ
Marcus Forsgren – bass (ex- Lionheart Brothers)
Jennifer P. Fraser – bass (ex- The Warlocks)
Marco "Storm" Hautakoski – drums (ex-Selfmindead)

Discography

Studio albums
Serena Maneesh (2005)
Serena Maneesh 2: Abyss in B Minor (2010)

EPs
Fixxations EP (December 2002 – CD; 22 September 2003 – 12", Norway)
Zurück: Retrospectives 1999-2003 (20 June 2005, Norway)
Enhanced CD; HoneyMilk Records (HONEY019)

Singles
"Drain Cosmetics" (12 June 2006, United Kingdom)
Enhanced CD; Playlouder Recordings (PLAYR7CD)
7" vinyl; Playlouder Recordings (PLAYR7S)
12" vinyl; Playlouder Recordings (PLAYR7T)
"Sapphire Eyes" (2 October 2006, United Kingdom)
CD; Playlouder Recordings (PLAYR12CD)
7" vinyl; Playlouder Recordings (PLAYR12S)
"Ayisha Abyss" (18 January 2010, United Kingdom)
12" vinyl, b/w: "Call-Back from a Dream"; 4AD (BAD 2941)

Split singles
Serena Maneesh / The Parkas: Singles Club No. 4 7" (2004) – Australia, Low Transit Industries LTID012
"Drive Me Home the Lonely Nights"
Serena Maneesh / Blood on the Wall 7" (February 2006) – United States, Insound
"Sapphire Eyes" (Serena-Maneesh Refix)

Appearances on compilations
"Blues Like Beehive" on Ŏya Festivalen: Oslo 08-10 Aug 2002 (1 May 2002, Norway)
CD; Øya Festival
"Leipziger Love Life" on The Pet Series Volume 1 (20 July 2002, Netherlands)
CD; Sally Forth Records (SF1059)
"Drive Me Home the Lonely Nights" on Counter Culture 05 (23 January 2006, United Kingdom)
2CD; V2/Rough Trade Shops (VVR1037732)

Music videos
"Drive Me Home the Lonely Nights" (1 May 2003), written and directed by Ola Bratt
"Drain Cosmetics" (4 June 2006)
"I Just Want to See Your Face" (12 March 2010)
"D.I.W.S.W.T.T.D" (7 Oct 2010)

References

External links
Official website
Urban Pollution Interview
Drain Cosmetics PodCast
Official Myspace
Subculture Magazine's review of "Serena Maneesh"
Serena Maneesh@HoneyMilk (domestic label)
Serena Maneesh@HypeCity (domestic label)
Serena Maneesh@Beggars US (USA label)
Serena Maneesh@Indigo/Beggars Group (German label)

Media links
Serena Maneesh LP
Drain Cosmetics promo Hi-Fi QuickTime for Win/Mac

"Drain Cosmetics" SP
Sapphire Eyes (Refix) legal MP3

Shoegazing musical groups
Norwegian alternative rock groups
Norwegian indie rock groups
Norwegian rock music groups
4AD artists
Musical groups established in 1999
1999 establishments in Norway
Musical groups from Oslo
Low Transit Industries artists